The men's light welterweight event was part of the boxing programme at the 1972 Summer Olympics. The weight class allowed boxers of up to 63.5 kilograms to compete. The competition was held from 30 August to 10 September 1972. 32 boxers from 32 nations competed.

Medalists

Results
The following boxers took part in the event:

First round
 James Montague (IRL) def. Nosrat Vakil Monfared (IRI), TKO-3
 Ray Seales (USA) def. Ulrich Beyer (GDR), 3:2
 Anatoliy Kamnev (URS) def. Roy Johnson (BER), KO-2
 Andres Molina (CUB) def. Pentti Saarman (FIN), TKO-2
 Emiliano Villa (COL) def. Tomsah Milwal Okalo (SUD), 5:0
 Graham Moughton (GBR) def. Malang Balouch (PAK), 5:0
 Zvonimir Vujin (YUG) def. Robert Mwakosya (TNZ), TKO-2
 Sodnomyn Gombo (MGL) def. Ytham Kunda (ZAM), 5:0
 Angel Angelov (BUL) def. Luis Contreras (VEN), TKO-3
 Walter Desiderio Gomez (ARG) def. Krzysztof Pierwieniecki (POL), 5:0
 Srisook Buntoe (THA) def. Ernesto Bergamasco (ITA), 4:1
 Calistrat Cuțov (ROU) def. Mohamed Muruli (UGA), 4:1
 Park Tai-Shik (KOR) def. Abdou Fall (SEN), TKO-3
 Issaka Dabore (NIG) def. Odartey Lawson (GHA), TKO-3
 Laudiel Negron (PUR) def. Obisia Nwakpa (NGR), 4:1
 Kyoji Shinohara (JPN) def. Fekadu Gabre Selassie (ETH), 5:0

Second round
 Ray Seales (USA) def. James Montague (IRL), 5:0
 Andres Molina (CUB) def. Anatoliy Kamnev (URS), KO-3
 Graham Moughton (GBR) def. Emiliano Villa (COL), 3:2
 Zvonimir Vujin (YUG) def. Sodnomyn Gombo (MGL), 3:2
 Angel Angelov (BUL) def. Walter Desiderio Gomez (ARG), 4:1
 Srisook Buntoe (THA) def. Calistrat Cuțov (ROU), TKO-3
 Issaka Dabore (NIG) def. Park Tai-Shik (KOR), TKO-3
 Kyoji Shinohara (JPN) def. Laudiel Negron (PUR), 5:0

Quarterfinals
 Ray Seales (USA) def. Andres Molina (CUB), 3:2
 Zvonimir Vujin (YUG) def. Graham Moughton (GBR), 5:0
 Angel Angelov (BUL) def. Srisook Bantow (THA), TKO-2
 Issaka Dabore (NIG) def. Kyoji Shinohara (JPN), 3:2

Semifinals
 Ray Seales (USA) def. Zvonimir Vujin (YUG), 5:0
 Angel Angelov (BUL) def. Issaka Dabore (NIG), 5:0

Final
 Ray Seales (USA) def. Angel Angelov (BUL), 3:2

References

Light Welterweight